Waleska is a city in Cherokee County, Georgia, United States. The population was 644 at the 2010 census.

History
The first white settlement in the Waleska area began in the early 1830s. Among these first pioneer settlers were the Reinhardt, Heard and Rhyne families, who moved into the region looking for fresh, fertile farm land. At first, these settlers lived among the Cherokee population already established in the area, but by 1838 all of the Cherokee had been forced westward to Oklahoma in the U.S. government relocation movement known as the Trail of Tears.

Early settler Lewis W. Reinhardt established a church in 1834 in the settlement known as Reinhardt Chapel and befriended many of the native Cherokee population. When the Trail of Tears forced the movement of Warluskee, the daughter of a local Cherokee chief and friend of Reinhardt's, westward, he named this settlement in her honor (see Funk Heritage Center below).

In 1883, Augustus M. Reinhardt, an Atlanta lawyer, former Confederate captain, and son of one of the founders of Waleska, along with his brother-in-law, former Civil War Lieutenant-Colonel John J. A. Sharp, founded Reinhardt Academy in Waleska for the impoverished children of Cherokee County. This school eventually became Reinhardt University.

The city was officially incorporated in 1889, over 50 years after the establishment of the original farming settlement.

While industry in Waleska's past has included tobacco farming, manufacturing, some mineral development, lumbering, and agriculture, which are both still active in the area, the chief "industry" of the town is and has always been Reinhardt University.

Geography

Waleska is located in northwestern Cherokee County at  (34.317968, -84.552951). State Routes 140 and 108 intersect in the center of town. SR 140 leads southeast  to Canton, the county seat, and west  to Adairsville. SR 108 leads northeast  to Tate and southwest  to Cartersville.

Demographics

2020 census

As of the 2020 United States census, there were 921 people, 94 households, and 67 families residing in the city.

2000 census
As of the census of 2000, there were 616 people living in the city.  The population density was 1.8 people per square mile (162.9/km).  The racial makeup of the city was 88.96% White, 3.90% African American, 0.32% Native American, 1.30% Asian, 0.16% Pacific Islander, 0.81% from other races, and 4.55% from two or more races. Hispanic or Latino of any race were 2.60% of the population.

There were 107 households, out of which 31.8% had children under the age of 18 living with them, 57.9% were married couples living together, 10.3% had a female householder with no husband present, and 26.2% were non-families. 23.4% of all households were made up of individuals, and 8.4% had someone living alone who was 65 years of age or older.  The average household size was 2.43 and the average family size was 2.81.

In the city, the population was spread out, with 10.7% under the age of 18, 58.4% from 18 to 24, 14.0% from 25 to 44, 11.9% from 45 to 64, and 5.0% who were 65 years of age or older.  The median age was 21 years. For every 100 females, there were 77.5 males.  For every 100 females age 18 and over, there were 74.6 males.

The median income for a household in the city was $46,071, and the median income for a family was $51,250. Males had a median income of $36,500 versus $33,750 for females. The per capita income for the city was $11,126.  About 5.5% of families and 5.1% of the population were below the poverty line, including none of those under age 18 and 18.9% of those age 65 or over.

Reinhardt University

Founded in 1883, Reinhardt offers undergraduate and graduate degrees and is affiliated with the United Methodist Church. In addition to this main campus, the school has an off-campus site, Reinhardt University's North Fulton Center, located in Alpharetta, and offers select programs of study in Cartersville and Canton, Georgia, as well as online courses.

Reinhardt University is also the home of the Funk Heritage Center, Georgia's Official Frontier and Southeastern Indian Interpretive Center.

Neighboring areas

References

External links
City of Waleska official website

 
Cities in Georgia (U.S. state)
Cities in Cherokee County, Georgia